The Church Avenue Line is a public transit line in Brooklyn, New York City, running mainly along 39th Street and Church Avenue between Sunset Park and Brownsville. Originally a streetcar line, it is now the B35 bus route, operated by MTA New York City Bus' Jackie Gleason Depot in Sunset Park.

Route description
The B35 bus route starts at a cut-off lane on 39th Street slightly east of 1st Avenue in Sunset Park, near Industry City and the South Brooklyn Marine Terminal. This terminus is shared with the B70. The B35 and B70 then run east on 39th Street until 3rd Avenue, where the B35 remains on 39th Street  and the B70 operates via 3rd Avenue and 36th/37th Streets, serving the 36th Street (BMT Fourth Avenue Line) station. At 4th Avenue, the B70 goes back to 39th Street and continues east on 39th Street until 8th Avenue. Here, the B70 heads south along 8th Avenue to Dyker Heights while the B35 continues east on 39th Street to 13th Avenue and 14th Avenues, where it switches to Church Avenue.

Once on Church Avenue, the B35 continues east along that street, serving multiple neighborhoods and interchanges with multiple bus and subway lines along the way. The line continues along the length of Church Avenue until East 98th Street, where buses turn south along East 98th Street and on Hegeman Avenue to the terminal at New Lots Avenue and Mother Gaston Boulevard in Brownsville.

The B35 also offers daily Limited-stop service (instituted in September 2005) between McDonald Avenue in Kensington and the route's Brownsville terminus at Mother Gaston Boulevard throughout the day. Limited-stop buses, however, make all stops between 1st Avenue and McDonald Avenue, and local service east of McDonald Avenue is provided by B35 local buses which only go to McDonald Avenue while Limited-stop service is running.

History
The line was built after 1897, connecting the 39th Street Ferry to the Canarsie Depot at Hegeman Avenue and Rockaway Avenue and a tunnel under Ocean Parkway. The streetcars continued to operate until October 30, 1956 when buses were substituted.

The Gravesend and Church Avenues Line ("13-Gravesend-Church") was physically a branch from the main line though it operated as a separate service, starting from the 16th Avenue loop at Gravesend Avenue (present-day McDonald Avenue) in Kensington heading north along Gravesend Avenue and joining the main line at Gravesend Avenue and Church Avenue. The operation as a separate line ended on June 1, 1949 though the same physical service was continued as a branch of the newly renumbered "35-Church Avenue Line" (renumbered from the "8-Church Avenue Line") until the end of Brooklyn streetcar operations.

Service on the McDonald Avenue portion of the line immediately after its demise was covered by a free transfer to the then-extended B69 Prospect Park West, 8th Avenue, and Vanderbilt Avenue bus route (the line has since been truncated at Windsor Terrace, then rerouted via 7th Avenue and extended back to Kensington-Cortelyou Road). After the truncation of the B69, the B67 McDonald Avenue and 7th Avenue bus route was extended to Cortelyou Road (which is slightly north of the old 16th Avenue Loop) which remains the same presently.

in 1975, the New York City Transit Authority began offering free transfers to it from the subway as a replacement for the Culver Shuttle.

In 2018, the B35 Limited was considered for conversion from  buses to articulated buses (or  buses). 3 New Flyer XN60 buses were delivered for clearance testing by the beginning of summer 2018, with full operation of artics beginning September 2, 2018. The XN60s are the first CNG powered articulated buses in New York City, being assigned to Jackie Gleason Depot. The B35 Limited is also being considered for conversion to Select Bus Service, a bus rapid transit system operated by NYC Bus.

Bus lanes for the B35 on Church Avenue between East 7th Street and Marlborough Road were put into effect in October 2019.

On December 1, 2022, the MTA released a draft redesign of the Brooklyn bus network. As part of the redesign, all B35 local buses would operate to Sunset Park at all times, and closely-spaced stops would be removed. The eastern part of the B35 Limited would be replaced by the B55, a new Select Bus Service route running from Kensington to John F. Kennedy International Airport via Church Avenue, New Lots Avenue, Linden Boulevard, and North and South Conduit Avenue.

References

Streetcar lines in Brooklyn
B035
B035
Railway lines opened in 1897